Erethistoides senkhiensis is a species of South Asian river catfish endemic to India where it is found in Senkhi stream, Arunachal Pradesh.  This species grows to a length of  SL.

References
 

Erethistidae
Fish of Asia
Fish of India
Taxa named by Lakpa Tamang
Taxa named by Shivaji Chaudhry
Taxa named by Dhrupad Choudhury
Fish described in 2008